Biblical Interpretation: A Journal of Contemporary Approaches is a peer-reviewed academic journal of biblical studies published in five issues per year by Brill Publishers. The editor-in-chief is Colleen Conway.

External links
 
 Print: 
 Online: 

Biblical studies journals
Brill Publishers academic journals
Hermeneutics
Publications established in 1993
English-language journals